Phi (uppercase Φ, lowercase φ, or maths symbol ϕ) is the 21st letter of the Greek alphabet.

Phi or PHI may also refer to:

Science and technology

Mathematics
 Golden ratio (φ)
 Phi coefficient, a measure of association for two binary variables introduced by Karl Pearson
 Euler's totient function or phi function
 Integrated information theory  (IIT) the symbol of which is φ is a mathematical theory of consciousness developed under the lead of the neuroscientist Giulio Tononi
  Standard normal distribution,  notating its cumulative distribution function and  its probability density function

Physics, chemistry and biology
 Phi meson, in particle physics
 Magnetic flux (Φ)
 Peptide PHI (Peptide histidine isoleucine)
 6-phospho-3-hexuloisomerase, an enzyme
 Phenyl group (Φ), a functional group in organic chemistry
 Pre-harvest interval
 pH(I), the isoelectric point

Computing
 Xeon Phi, an Intel MIC microprocessor
 Φ (Phi) function, in static single-assignment form compiler design

Medicine
 Permanent health insurance, against becoming disabled
 Protected health information, in US law

Other science
 Phi phenomenon, in visual perception
 Krumbein phi scale, for the size of a particle or sediment

Arts and entertainment
 Phi (KinKi Kids album) (2007)
 Phi (Truckfighters album) (2007)
 Sailor Phi, a villain in the Sailor Moon manga
 Phi, a character in the visual novels Zero Escape: Virtue's Last Reward and Zero Escape: Zero Time Dilemma.
 Phi: A Voyage from the Brain to the Soul, a book by Giulio Tononi (2012)
 Phi, a character from Beyblade Burst Turbo, a TV show written by Hiro Morita

Organizations
 Packard Humanities Institute
 Paraprofessional Healthcare Institute, a nonprofit organization based in New York City, US
 Pepco Holdings Inc.
 Petroleum Helicopters International, an American commercial helicopter operator
 Philadelphia’s major professional sports teams
 Philadelphia Eagles of the National Football League
 Philadelphia 76ers of the National Basketball Association
 Philadelphia Phillies of Major League Baseball
 Philadelphia Flyers of the National Hockey League
 Post-Polio Health International
 Phi, a collegiate secret society at Princeton University

Other uses
 Voiceless bilabial fricative
 Phi, a village in Sesant, Cambodia
 Phi, ghosts in Thai culture

See also
 Փ, a letter of the Armenian alphabet
 PHI-base (Pathogen–Host Interaction database)
 Kamen Rider 555 or Masked Rider Φ's